Chiroderma – big-eyed bats or white-lined bats – is a genus of leaf-nosed bat found in North America, Central America, and South America and the Lesser Antilles.

Species
The following species were recognized , and a total of seven species to 2020 

 Brazilian big-eyed bat, Chiroderma doriae 
 Gorgas's big-eyed bat, Chiroderma gorgasi 
 Guadeloupe big-eyed bat, Chiroderma improvisum 
 Salvin's big-eyed bat, Chiroderma salvini 
 Mexican big-eyed bat, Chiroderma scopaeum 
 Little big-eyed bat, Chiroderma trinitatum 
 Hairy big-eyed bat, Chiroderma villosum 
 Vizotto's big-eyed bat Chiroderma vizottoi,

References

Further reading

 

 
Bat genera
Taxa named by Wilhelm Peters